The Pretty Sound is an album led by jazz trumpeter Joe Wilder recorded in 1959 and first released on the Columbia label.

Reception

The Allmusic review by Wade Kergan stated: "Wilder is joined by Urbie Green, Hank Jones, Jerome Richardson, and Herbie Mann on Pretty Sound of Joe Wilder, which lives up to its name on a tasteful selection of ballads and standards".

Track listing
 "Harbor Lights" (Hugh Williams, Jimmy Kennedy) – 3:39
 "I Hear Music" (Burton Lane, Frank Loesser) – 3:21
 "It's So Peaceful in the Country" (Alec Wilder) – 5:02
 "Autumn in New York" (Vernon Duke) – 5:03
 "Guys and Dolls" (Loesser) – 4:17
 "Blue Moon" (Richard Rodgers, Lorenz Hart) – 4:14
 "Caravan" (Juan Tizol, Duke Ellington) – 4:49
 "Greensleeves" (Traditional) – 3:30
 "The Boy Next Door" (Hugh Martin, Ralph Blane) – 3:22
 "Lullabye" (Johannes Brahms) – 3:03

Personnel
Joe Wilder – trumpet 
Urbie Green – trombone (tracks 1, 3, 5, 6 & 8-10)
Herbie Mann – flute (tracks 2, 4 & 7)
Phil Bodner – English horn, flute, clarinet, saxophone,  (tracks 1, 6 & 9)
Jerome Richardson – clarinet, saxophone (tracks 1, 3, 5, 6 & 8-10)
Jerry Sanfino – flute, clarinet, saxophone (tracks 3, 5, 8 & 10)
Hank Jones – piano
Al Cassamenti – guitar
George Duvivier – bass (tracks 1, 3, 5, 6 & 8-10)
Milt Hinton – bass (tracks 2, 4 & 7)
John Cresci Jr. – drums  (tracks 2, 4 & 7)
Osie Johnson – drums (tracks 3, 5, 8 & 10)
Don Lamond – drums (tracks 1, 6 & 9)
Mike Colicchio – arranger

References

Columbia Records albums
Joe Wilder albums
1959 albums